Dundee is a census-designated place in central Wayne Township, Tuscarawas County, Ohio, United States.  It has a post office with the ZIP code 44624.  It lies at the intersection of State Routes 93 and 516.

History
Dundee was laid out and platted in 1847. A post office called Dundee has been in operation since 1847.

References

Census-designated places in Ohio
Census-designated places in Tuscarawas County, Ohio